Nissim Amon (Hebrew: ניסים אמון; born 1963) is an Israeli Zen master and meditation teacher. He is the developer of the Trilotherapy therapeutic system and the author and translator of several books and publications.

Biography

Nissim Amon was born in Jerusalem in 1963 to a secular family. He served in the Israeli Defense Forces under the Nahal Brigade and fought in the Lebanon War. After his military service, he went on a trip to the Far East and became acquainted with Buddhism.

Amon later joined a Zen Buddhist monastery in South Korea, where he enrolled in a curriculum in English for Western monks. At that time, Westerners were not required to undergo the long mentorship period of their Korean counterparts. At the Hwa Gye Sa monastery, he became the first Israeli monk in Korea.Under the guidance of Zen Master Seung Sahn, Amon received his accreditation as a meditation teacher. Afterwards, he continued on to Japan, there he joined the dojo of Zen Master G. W. Nishijima of the Soto Zen order. There, Amon was trained and certified as a Zen master. From there, he continued to Pune, India and taught Zen at Osho's Multiversity. There, he was exposed to various therapeutic methods that combined Zen Buddhism and Western psychological approaches, first amongst which was the Gestalt approach.

Upon his return to Israel, Amon established and managed a class for higher consciousness at Madison college. He published several books on the topic of meditation and hosted groups and retreats. He also hosted a television program entitled Sod Ha Osher Ha Pnimi (the secret of internal happiness) on Israeli Channel 8.

Amon married Merav and in 2001, the couple moved to the Greek island of Paros, where he established, along with his partners, a meditation and retreat center called Tao's. During his time there, he developed the Trilotherapy system. In Trilotherapy, the therapist turns to two separate aspects of a patient's personality, intellect and emotion—"The Internal Children", according to the theory—and communicates with them separately. This communication awakens a third entity—The Middle, "The Parent" which, according to the theory, embodies the "True Self", towards which the path of Zen is aimed.

In 2008, Amon returned to Israel and currently resides with his family in Amikam.

Publications
  – Hidat Ha Lotus (The Lotus Riddle) (1997)
  – KeShe Moshe Pagash et Buddha (When Moses Met Buddha)
  – Mi Natan La Pil Af Aroch Ve Mi Matach et Ha Girafa? (Who Gave the Elephant a long Snout and Who Stretched the Giraffe?) (Tao book for children) (2004)
  – Avkat Namer (Tiger's Powder) (2011)
  – Kwan Se Om (Music CD), with Ori Ofir
  Eastern Wisdom: The Treasure Box (Gatekeeper Press, 2017)

References

External links

  
 Trilotherapy official website

1963 births
Living people
Israeli writers
Zen Buddhists
Spiritual teachers
 Israeli Buddhists
Israeli spiritual writers
Writers from Jerusalem
Israeli spiritual teachers